Troglocubazomus is a monotypic genus of hubbardiid short-tailed whipscorpions, first described by Rolando Teruel in 2003. Its single species, Troglocubazomus orghidani is distributed in Cuba.

References 

Schizomida genera
Monotypic arachnid genera
Taxa described in 2003